August Penguin is an annual gathering (since 2002) of the Israeli Free Software community, organized by Hamakor. The conference is held on the first Friday in August (hence its name), usually in the Tel Aviv area. It lasts one day and includes technical talks, projects' status updates, social meetings and followed by a keysigning party.

During the conference, the winner of Hamakor Prize for free software-related achievements is announced.

See also

 List of computer-related awards

External links
 August Penguin’s Homepage (mostly in Hebrew with an English page)
 Hamakor homepage (in Hebrew)

Free-software events
Free-software awards

he:המקור (עמותה)#כנס "אוגוסט פינגווין"